The Shoshone River is a  long river in northern Wyoming in the United States.  Its headwaters are in the Absaroka Range in Shoshone National Forest.  It ends when it runs into the Big Horn River near Lovell, Wyoming.  Cities it runs near or through are Cody, Powell, Byron, and Lovell.  Near Cody, it runs through a volcanically active region of fumaroles known as Colter's Hell. This contributed to the river being named on old maps of Wyoming as the Stinking Water River.

The current name was established in 1901 due to popular demand.

West of Cody the river is impounded in Shoshone Canyon by the Buffalo Bill Dam, created as part of the Shoshone project; one of the nation's first water conservation projects. A number of hot springs along the Shoshone were drowned by the reservoir.  Upstream of Buffalo Bill Reservoir the Shoshone splits into the North Fork, which follows a long canyon down from the Absaroka Mountains to the vicinity of the east entrance of Yellowstone National Park, and the South Fork, which originates at the southern end of the Absarokas.

See also
Mummy Cave, an alcove eroded into a cliff face by the North Fork of the Shoshone that has yielded evidence of 9000 years of occupation
Shoshonite

References 

Rivers of Wyoming
Tributaries of the Yellowstone River
Rivers of Park County, Wyoming
Rivers of Big Horn County, Wyoming